Toyda 1-ya is a rural locality (a settlement) in Oktyabrskoye Rural Settlement, Paninsky District, Voronezh Oblast, Russia. The population was 596 as of 2010. There are 8 streets.

Geography 
Toyda 1-ya is located 17 km south of Panino (the district's administrative centre) by road. Shaninsky is the nearest rural locality.

References 

Rural localities in Paninsky District